Patterson-Hooper Family Cemetery is a historic cemetery located at Endwell in Broome County, New York. The cemetery was originally part of the Amos Patterson family farm and the first burials occurred in 1800 and 1804.  A single large obelisk marking the center of the plot memorializes members of the Patterson family. Burials date from 1800 to 1910 with the majority before 1850.

It was listed on the National Register of Historic Places in 2008.

References

External links
 
 Amos Patterson House materials – Library of Congress

Cemeteries on the National Register of Historic Places in New York (state)
Cemeteries in Broome County, New York
National Register of Historic Places in Broome County, New York